Vanuatu maintains diplomatic relations with many countries, and it has a small network of diplomatic missions. Australia, France, Japan, New Zealand, the People's Republic of China and the United Kingdom maintain embassies, High Commissions, or missions in Port Vila. The British High Commission maintained a continued presence for almost a century, though closed from 2005 until reopening in 2019.

The government's main concern has been to bolster the economy. In keeping with its need for financial assistance, Vanuatu has joined the Asian Development Bank, the World Bank, the International Monetary Fund (IMF). According to ABC Radio Australia, "Foreign policy issues that feature in Vanuatu include wide support for the Free West Papua Movement and broadly for independence throughout Melanesia, the One China Policy and relations with Australia and New Zealand." On the latter topic, guest worker programmes feature prominently.

History

1980s: the Lini policies

Vanuatu (formerly the New Hebrides) obtained independence from France and the United Kingdom in 1980. The country's first elected leader, Prime Minister Father Walter Lini, governed Vanuatu from 1980 to 1991, and shaped its initial foreign policy in distinct ways. The key bases of Lini's foreign policy were non-alignment and anti-colonialism, support for independence movements around the world - from faraway Western Sahara to neighbouring New Caledonia, as well as East Timor and West Papua, who all received Vanuatu's support at the United Nations.

Vanuatu notably angered Indonesia by allowing the Free Papua Movement to open an office in Port-Vila. Vanuatu in the 1980s was the only country in Oceania not to align with the Western bloc in the dying stages of the Cold War. Rejecting support either for the West or for the East, Vanuatu joined the Non-Aligned Movement in 1983, and only established diplomatic relations with the Soviet Union and the United States in June and September 1986, respectively.

In keeping with this policy, Vanuatu established diplomatic relations with Cuba in 1983, and with Libya in 1986. Lini openly condemned the 1986 bombing of Libya by the United States, sending a message of condoleances to Colonel Muammar Gaddafi, while Barak Sopé accused the United States of being a State sponsor of terrorism. The same accusation was levelled by Vanuatu against France after the sinking of the Rainbow Warrior. Relations with the United States were tense until the late 1980s, when a State visit to Washington by Lini and Foreign Affairs Minister Sela Molisa contributed to a lessening of tensions. Relations with France remained strained throughout the 1980s for a variety of reasons.

Lini's government opposed French nuclear tests at Mururoa, and spoke out repeatedly against apartheid in South Africa. Vanuatu was a member of the United Nations Special Committee against Apartheid. In 1990, Vanuatu's ambassador to the United Nations Robert Van Lierop remarked proudly: "I think that Vanuatu's contribution to the United Nations is somewhat disproportionate in relation to its size. [...] When the Prime Minister met Nelson Mandela in Namibia, Mandela knew about Vanuatu because it has always been among the countries in the region that have most clearly spoken out on the problem of apartheid".

Vanuatu under Walter Lini also sought to create solid relations with Asia, and, by the end of the decade, had established official diplomatic relations with the People's Republic of China, Japan, South Korea, North Korea, Thailand, Malaysia, Singapore, Vietnam and the Philippines.

1990s: the Carlot Korman and Vohor years

Following the 1991 general election, the francophone Union of Moderate Parties became the dominant party in Parliament, and Maxime Carlot Korman became the country's first francophone Prime Minister. He "reversed [the country's] unequivocal support for the Kanak National Liberation Front in New Caledonia, its systematic enmity towards France, its flirting with radical regimes, and its openly anti-American nuclear-free Pacific stance." Francophones held power, under Carlot Korman or Serge Vohor, until 1998.

Foreign policy issues

Aid 

Since 1980, Australia, the United Kingdom, France, and New Zealand have provided the bulk of Vanuatu's development aid. As of March 2008, Australia was Vanuatu's biggest aid provider, followed by France. A number of other countries, including Japan, Canada, Germany, and various multilateral organizations, such as the Economic and Social Council for Asia and the Pacific, the UN Development Programme, the Asian Development Bank, the European Economic Community, and the Commonwealth Development Corporation also provide developmental aid. The United States, Canada, Australia, New Zealand, the United Kingdom, South Korea and Japan also send volunteers. Since the mid-2000s, Cuba has been a noted provider of medical aid.

Support to the right of self-determination

Vanuatu continues to promote the right to self-determination. In 1980s SADR and Palestine was recognized. Later, Vanuatu recognized Kosovo in 2010 and Abkhazia in 2011. Vanuatu is the only country in the world that recognizes all four of these states. In addition, Vanuatu strongly supports the Free Papua Movement and its program of self-determination of West Papua, a region in Indonesia, in the midst of Papua conflict. Vanuatu's bringing up the issue at international forums has brought sharp rebukes from Indonesia; according to its diplomats, "it is shameful that [Vanuatu has an] excessive and unhealthy obsession about how Indonesia should govern itself" and states that Vanuatu is "not a representation of the people of Papua, and stop fantasising of being one."

Wantok Blong Yumi Bill

In June 2010, the Parliament of Vanuatu unanimously gave its support to a motion – the Wantok Blong Yumi Bill – clarifying Vanuatu's foreign policy with regards to West Papuan independence claims from Indonesia. The bill, tabled by Independent MP Ralph Regenvanu and supported by Prime Minister Edward Natapei and opposition leader Maxime Carlot Korman, committed Vanuatu to recognising West Papua's independence; to seeking observer status for West Papua in the Melanesian Spearhead Group and in the Pacific Islands Forum; and to "request[ing] [United Nations] General Assembly support for the International Court of Justice to provide an advisory opinion on the process in which the former Dutch New Guinea was ceded to Indonesia in the 1960s".

International organizational participation

Regional relations

Vanuatu maintains strong regional ties in the Pacific. It is a full member of the Pacific Islands Forum, the South Pacific Applied Geoscience Commission, the South Pacific Tourism Organisation, the Pacific Regional Environment Programme and the Secretariat of the Pacific Community. Vanuatu is one of the eight signatories of the Nauru Agreement Concerning Cooperation in the Management of Fisheries of Common Interest which collectively controls 25-30% of the world's tuna supply and approximately 60% of the western and central Pacific tuna supply. Vanuatu endorsed the Treaty of Rarotonga (the South Pacific Nuclear Free Zone Treaty) in 1995.

Extra-regional organizational relations

Vanuatu has been a member of the Organisation internationale de la Francophonie since 1979 (the year before it gained independence from France). Vanuatu was admitted to the Commonwealth of Nations in 1980 and to the United Nations in 1981. Vanuatu is currently the only Pacific nation that belongs to the Non-Aligned Movement,

Additionally outside the region, Vanuatu is a member or participant of the ACP (Lomé Convention), the Alliance of Small Island States, Asian Development Bank, Economic and Social Commission for Asia and the Pacific (ESCAP), the Food and Agriculture Organization (FAO), the G-77, the International Bank for Reconstruction and Development, the International Civil Aviation Organization, the International Red Cross and Red Crescent Movement, the International Development Association, the International Finance Corporation, the IMF, the International Maritime Organization, the International Olympic Committee, the International Telecommunication Union (ITU), the Universal Postal Union and the World Meteorological Organization. Vanuatu became a member of the WTO in 2012. Vanuatu is also a non-signatory user of Intelsat.

Vanuatu became a member of Interpol in 2018 and is currently a suspended member of the International Hydrographic Organization - since 2019.

On 4 December 2020, Vanuatu became the sixth ever nation to graduate from the United Nations official list of Least Developed Countries (LDC). After meeting graduation thresholds in the Human Assets Index and income in 2006, 2009 and 2012, the UN Committee for Development Policy recommended graduation. The UN Economic and Social Council and UN General Assembly approved of the recommendation in 2012 and 2013, but after Cyclone Pam Vanuatu was granted an extension until 2020. The country lost exclusive access to certain international support measures such as in the areas of development assistance and trade.

Countries with diplomatic relations

Table

See also

 List of diplomatic missions in Vanuatu
 List of diplomatic missions of Vanuatu

References

 
Vanuatu and the Commonwealth of Nations